The Hotel Clovis is a ten-story former hotel in Clovis, New Mexico, United States. Designed by architect Robert Merrell, the Art Deco structure was opened as a hotel on October 20, 1931. Hotel Clovis was added to the National Register of Historic Places in 1984.

Although the hotel closed in 1983, Developer Stephen Crozier launched an extensive renovation, announcing that he would build 31 loft-style apartments in the Art Deco building, as well as creating some 8,000 square feet of commercial space. The developer also wanted to build two separate structures that will house an additional 59 units. Groundbreaking started September 30, 2011 and the construction project became the Hotel Clovis Lofts. Hotel Clovis Lofts is now (as of January 2020) occupied.

Though first touted as "upper-income assisted living" the apartments are HUD assisted and lower income housing. As of mid-2017, the street-level commercial spaces remain unoccupied and have not been architecturally finished. Developer Steven Crozier has continued building additional apartments two blocks west of the Hotel Clovis encompassing a full city block.

See also

 National Register of Historic Places listings in Curry County, New Mexico

References

Art Deco architecture in New Mexico
Defunct hotels in the United States
Hotel buildings completed in 1931
Hotel buildings on the National Register of Historic Places in New Mexico
National Register of Historic Places in Curry County, New Mexico
Clovis, New Mexico